Melinda Leigh Smith (born June 1, 1972, Long Island, New York) is an American singer-songwriter. Her first record deal came after she sang a cover version of the song "Jolene" by Dolly Parton.

Music career
Smith was adopted at birth by a non-denominational Protestant minister and his wife, who was choir director at the church. She grew up on Long Island, New York. After her mother died of cancer in 1991, Smith attended Cincinnati Bible College for two years.

Smith and her father moved to Knoxville, Tennessee, where she began listening to folk and bluegrass music, Alison Krauss, and the Cox Family. In 1998, she moved to Nashville to pursue a career in music. Two years later, she reached the finals of a contest at the Kerrville Folk Festival. This led to a contract with Big Yellow Dog Music.

Smith attracted attention in 2003 when she sang a cover version of "Jolene" by Dolly Parton for the tribute album
Just Because I'm a Woman. Soon after, she signed a contract with Vanguard Records, who released her debut album, One Moment More in 2004. In addition to Dolly Parton, she has expressed admiration for John Prine, Alison Krauss, Patty Griffin, Shania Twain, Kris Kristofferson, Buddy Miller, and Bill Gaither.

"Come to Jesus" was her biggest hit, receiving airplay on country, Christian, adult album alternative (AAA), and adult contemporary radio. The song charted at No. 32 on the Adult Top 40 chart of Billboard magazine. In 2004 Smith appeared at the Cambridge Folk Festival in the U.K., which was broadcast nationally on BBC Radio.

In October 2006, Smith released "Out Loud", the first single from her second album Long Island Shores. The song was well received by AAA rock radio and Country Music Television (CMT). On January 10, 2007, she performed "Please Stay" on The Tonight Show with Jay Leno.

In October 2007, Smith released a Christmas album, My Holiday. She wrote six original songs, including "I Know the Reason" with Thad Cockrell.

In August 2009, Smith released her fourth studio album, Stupid Love. She appeared on The Early Show on August 15, 2009, to perform the first single, "Highs and Lows". On September 29, 2009, while promoting the album on the syndicated radio show World Cafe, she disclosed that she had obsessive–compulsive disorder.

In June 2012, Smith released an independent studio album, Mindy Smith on her own Giant Leap label in conjunction with TVX. In October of the same year Vanguard Records released a compilation album of her songs entitled "The Essential Mindy Smith".

On October 29, 2013, Smith released a Christmas EP entitled Snowed In on the Giant Leap/TVX label. This release contained original material and covers of Christmas songs.

Charity
In March 2013, Smith worked with Anthropologie during an in-store performance to raise money and awareness for the Captain Planet Foundation, a non-profit organization. Anthropologie donated fifteen percent of sales made in the first hour after Smith's performance to CPF.

Awards and honors
 Best New/Emerging Artist of the Year,  Americana Music Association, 2004

Discography

Studio albums

Compilations

Extended plays

Singles

Music videos

Special appearances
Just Because I'm a Woman: The Songs of Dolly Parton (2003) - Track: "Jolene"
 Sweetheart 2005: Love Songs (2005) - Track: "A Nightingale Sang in Berkeley Square"
 This Bird Has Flown – A 40th Anniversary Tribute to the Beatles' Rubber Soul (2005) - Track: "The Word"
 Stronger Than Before by Olivia Newton-John (2005) - Track: "Phenomenal Woman"
 Those Were The Days by Dolly Parton (2005) - Track: "The Cruel War"

References

External links
 
 CMT Profile

1972 births
American bluegrass musicians
American country singer-songwriters
American women country singers
American folk singers
American performers of Christian music
Living people
People with obsessive–compulsive disorder
Singer-songwriters from New York (state)
21st-century American singers
21st-century American women singers
Country musicians from New York (state)